Science City station may refer to:
Science City station (Chengdu Metro)
Science City station (Guangzhou Metro)